Jah No Dead is a studio album by Burning Spear released in 2003.

Track listing
"Social Living" - Long Version
"Marcus Say Jah No Dead"
"Slavery Days"
"The Invasion"
"Marcus Garvey"
"Man in the Hills" - Album Version
"Throw Down Your Arms"
"People Get Ready" - Album Version
"Dry & Heavy"
"Civilised Reggae"
"I and I Survive" (Slavery Days)
"The Ghost" (Marcus Garvey)
"Jah No Dead"

2003 compilation albums
Burning Spear compilation albums
Island Records compilation albums